The Writers listed below were either born in Bangladesh or else published much of their writing while living in that country.

A B C D E F G H I J K L M N O P Q R S 
T U V W X Y Z 

A

 Abdul Hakim
 Abu Ishaque
 Abul Mansur Ahmed
 Abdullah Abu Sayeed
 Abdush Shakoor
 Abu Rushd
 Abdur Rouf Choudhury
 Abul Fazal
 Abul Asad
 Abdul Mannan Syed
 Akhteruzzaman Elias
 Al Mahmud
 Alaol
 Alauddin Al-Azad
 Anisul Hoque
 Anwar Pasha
 Aly Zaker
 Ahsan Habib
 Ahmed Sofa
 Aroj Ali Matubbar
 Asad Chowdhury

B
 Bande Ali Mia
 Begum Rokeya
 Bipradash Barua

D
 Dilwar Khan
 Dilara Hashem

F
 Farah Ghuznavi
 Farrukh Ahmad

G
 Golam Mostofa

H

 Harun Ar Rashid
 Humayun Ahmed
 Humayun Azad
 Hasan Azizul Huq
 Hason Raja
 Hasnat Abdul Hye 
 Humayun Kabir Dhali
 Husne Ara Shahed

I
 Imdadul Haq Milan
 Ismail Hossain Siraji

J
 Jahanara Imam
 Jasimuddin
 Shahid Mahmud Jangi

K

 Kaberi Gain
 Kabir Chowdhury
 Kaykobad
 Kazi Nazrul Islam 
 K. Anis Ahmed
 Khondakar Ashraf Hossain

M

 Mir Mosharraf Hossain
 Moinul Ahsan Saber
 Muhammad Asadullah Al-Ghalib
 Mohammad Barkatullah
 Mohammad Lutfur Rahman
 Mokbula Manzoor
 Mohammad Nurul Huda
 Muhammed Zafar Iqbal
 Muhammad Mansuruddin
 Muhammad Shahidullah
 Munier Choudhury
 M Sakhawat Hossain

N

Nurul Momen
Nirmalendu Goon
Neamat Imam
Nilima Ibrahim

R

Rahat Khan
Rashid Askari
Rashid Haider
Rashid Karim
Razia Khan
Rizia Rahman
Rudra Mohammad Shahidullah

S

 Sadat Hossain
 Selim Al Deen
 Selina Hossain
 Shaheen Akhtar
 Shahidullah Kaiser
 Shahidul Zahir
 Shamsuddin Abul Kalam
 Shamsur Rahman
 Shawkat Ali (novelist)
 Shawkat Osman
 Shazia Omar
 Sufia Kamal
 Sheikh Fazlul Karim
 Syed Ali Ahsan
 Syed Mujtaba Ali
 Syed Shamsul Haque
 Syed Waliullah
 Saad Z Hossain

T
Taslima Nasrin
Tahmima Anam

Z
 Zahir Raihan

See also
Bengali Literature
List of Bangladeshi people

References

 
Lists of writers by nationality